Ctenochelidae is a family of crustaceans belonging to the infraorder Axiidea, within the order Decapoda.

It contains the following genera:
 Ctenocheles Kishinouye, 1926
 Ctenocheloides Anker, 2010
 Dawsonius R.B.Manning & Felder, 1991
 Gourretia de Saint Laurent, 1973
 Kiictenocheloides K.Sakai, 2011
 Laurentgourretia K.Sakai, 2004
 Paragourretia K.Sakai, 2004

References

Decapods